Streer Paona is a 1991 Bangladeshi film. It stars Ilyas Kanchan, Diti, Shabana, Alamgir and Nuton in the lead roles. The latter earned Bangladesh National Film Award for Best Supporting Actress for this film.

Cast
 Shabana
 Alamgir
 Ilyas Kanchan
 Nuton
 Diti
 Wasimul Bari Rajib

Soundtrack 
Alauddin Ali has composed all the songs.

Accolades 
 16th Bangladesh National Film Awards Best Supporting Actress – Nuton

References

External links 
 

Films scored by Alauddin Ali
1990s Bengali-language films
Bengali-language Bangladeshi films